Inger Marianne Elisabeth Jalakas (born 15 December 1951) is a Swedish author and journalist. She studied mathematics and Earth science at the University of Gothenburg 1975–76 and 1978–79 she studied at Journalisthögskolan i Göteborg.

Selected bibliography

Non-fiction books
1980 – Smockor och smek: hotande läsning: om ungdomstidningar
1995 – Bara barn: om sexturism och slaveri
1997 – Jävlar anamma, mamma!: handbok i överlevnad för ensamma mammor
2000 – Den nyttiga nosen
2003 – Från utbränd till nytänd
2005 – Agility: från start till mål
2007 – Nördsyndromet: allt du behöver veta om Aspergers syndrom
2010 – Sex, kärlek & Aspergers syndrom: med kärleksskola för aspergare

Novels/short stories
1999 – Lustmord (short stories, together with Ulla Trenter)
2000 – Krokodilens leende
2004 – Svarta diamanter: elva berättelser om liv och död (anthology, together with among Carina Burman)

Detective novels about Margareta Nordin
2001 – Borde vetat bättre
2005 – Sinne utan svek
2006 – Den ryske mannen
2007 – Ur min aska
2009 – Hat

Children's books
2003 – Min modiga mormor (illustrator: Helena Bergendahl)
2005 – Min modiga mormor och noshörningen Nofu (illustrator: Helena Bergendahl)
2006 – Min modiga mormor och den dansande elefanten (illustrator: Helena Bergendahl)

References

External links
Official website
bibliography

1951 births
Living people
People from Nässjö Municipality
Swedish women writers
Swedish crime fiction writers
Writers from Småland
Swedish-language writers
Swedish children's writers
Swedish journalists
Women crime fiction writers